The Ituri River is a river of the Democratic Republic of the Congo. It is the main tributary of the Aruwimi River, which forms where the Ituri meets the Nepoko River.
It gives its name to Ituri Province.

Course

It flows generally south into Ituri province, and flows past Mongbwalu to the east.
It is joined from the left by the Malibongo River near Komanda Helipad.
From there it flows in a generally westward direction to Bomili in Tshopo province, where it is joined by the Nepoko River to form the Aruwimi. 

The river flows through the  Ituri Rainforest.
About one-fifth of the rainforest is made up of the Okapi Wildlife Reserve, a World Heritage Site.

History

In 1903 prospectors working for the Congo Free State discovered gold in the Ituri River.
This led to the opening of the Kilo mine in 1905 and the Moto mine in 1911, and in 1919 to creation of the Régie Industrielle des Mines de Kilo-Moto.

Notes

Sources

Rivers of the Democratic Republic of the Congo